Judy Llewellyn Bradley, née Bratt (born October 18, 1952) is a Canadian former provincial politician. She was the Saskatchewan New Democratic Party member of the Legislative Assembly of Saskatchewan for the constituencies of Bengough-Milestone from 1991 to 1995, and Weyburn-Big Muddy from 1995 to 1999.

References

1952 births
Living people
Politicians from Regina, Saskatchewan
Saskatchewan New Democratic Party MLAs
Women MLAs in Saskatchewan
20th-century Canadian legislators
20th-century Canadian women politicians